Petőfi '73 is a 1973 Hungarian drama film directed by Ferenc Kardos. It was entered into the 1973 Cannes Film Festival.

Cast
 Mihály Kovács - Sándor Petőfi
 Nóra Kovács - Szendrey júlia
 Can Togay - Kossuth Lajos
 Tibor Csizmadia - Vasvári Pál
 Csaba Oszkay - Madarász László
 Péter Szuhay - Görgey Artúr
 Attila Köhalmi - Jókai Mór
 Miklós Donik - Orlay Petrik Soma
 Tibor Spáda - Bem József
 Péter Blaskó - Klapka György
 János Marosvölgyi - Dembinszky
 Zoltán Fábián - Damjanich János
 Kata Kánya
 Péter Fried

References

External links

1973 films
Hungarian drama films
1970s Hungarian-language films
1973 drama films
Films directed by Ferenc Kardos